Salkey is a surname. Notable people with the surname include:
 Andrew Salkey (1928-1995), Jamaican novelist, poet, children's book writer, and journalist
 Jason Salkey (born 1962), English actor